Germantown Special Services District of Philadelphia is an American municipal authority.  It was established to provide business improvement district services in the Germantown neighborhood of Northwest Philadelphia, in the US state of Pennsylvania.  It was created by Bill 1027 (18 April 1995) for an initial term of five years.  However, Bill No. 000397 revised that termination date and set the District's date of expiration as 31 December 2025.

See also
 List of municipal authorities in Philadelphia

References

Special services districts in Philadelphia
Municipal authorities in Pennsylvania